The Serpent (French title: Le Serpent) is a 2006 French thriller film written and directed by Éric Barbier and based on the 1971 novel Plender by Ted Lewis.

Plot
A father on the verge of divorce sees his life fall apart after a former classmate brings murder, kidnapping and blackmail into his life. His only chance to escape is by entering the former classmate's world.

Cast
 Yvan Attal as Vincent Mandel
 Clovis Cornillac as Joseph Plender
 Minna Haapkylä as Hélène
 Pierre Richard as Cendras
 Simon Abkarian as Sam
 Olga Kurylenko as Sofia
 Veronika Varga as Catherine
 Jean-Claude Bouillon as Max
 Pierre Marzin as Carbona
 Gerald Laroche as Becker
 Abdelhafid Metalsi as Police Officer at the cemetery
 Manon Tournier as Julietter

See also
 List of French films
 Cinema of France

External links

References

2006 thriller films
2006 films
French thriller films
2000s French-language films
Films based on British novels
Films directed by Éric Barbier
2000s French films